HMS Anne was a 70-gun third rate ship of the line of the English, built under the 1677 Construction Programme by Phineas Pett II at Chatham Dockyard during 1677/78. She fought in the War of English Succession 1688 to 1697. She fought in the Battle of Beachy Head where she was severely damaged and ran aground. She was burnt by the English to avoid capture by the French. The wreck is a Protected Wreck managed by Historic England.

She was the sixth vessel to bear the name Anne since it was used for a ballinger built at Southampton in 1416 and sold on 26 June 1426.

Construction and Specifications
She was ordered in April 1677 to be built at Chatham Dockyard under the guidance of Master Shipwright Phineas Pett. She was launched in November 1678. Her builder's measure tonnage was calculated as 1,051 tons.

Her initial gun armament was in accordance with the 1677 Establishment with 72/60 guns consisting of twenty-six demi-cannons (54 cwt, 9.5 ft) on the lower deck, twenty-four 12-pounder guns (32 cwt, 9 ft) on the upper deck, ten sakers (16 cwt, 7 ft) on the quarterdeck and four sakers (16 cwt, 7 ft) on the foc’x’le with four 3-pounder guns (5 cwt, 5 ft) on the poop deck or roundhouse. By 1688 she would carry 70 guns as per the 1685 Establishment . Their initial manning establishment would be for a crew of 460/380/300 personnel.

Commissioned Service

Anne was commissioned in 1687 under the command of Captain Cloudesley Shovell as the flagship of the Duke of Grafton was part of the fleet that escorted the Queen of Portugal Maria Sophia of Neuberg to Plymouth. With the outbreak of the War of English Succession, she was commissioned in 1690 under the command of Captain John Tyrrell. She participated in the Battle of Beachy Head on 30 June 1690 as a member of Blue Squadron. Dismasted in the battle, Anne was run aground near Winchelsea and burnt on the 5th July 1690 to avoid capture. She was the only English ship lost during the battle.  The remains, on the low water mark of the beach near Pett Level, East Sussex, were designated under the  British Protection of Wrecks Act on 20 June 1974. The wreck is owned by the Nautical Museums Trust (Shipwreck Museum Hastings).

Citations

References

Lavery, Brian (2003) The Ship of the Line - Volume 1: The development of the battlefleet 1650-1850. Conway Maritime Press. .
 Colledge (2020), Ships of the Royal Navy, by J.J. Colledge, revised and updated by Lt Cdr Ben Warlow and Steve Bush, published by Seaforth Publishing, Barnsley, Great Britain, © 2020,  (EPUB), Section N (Northumberland)
 Winfield (2009), British Warships in the Age of Sail (1603 – 1714), by Rif Winfield, published by Seaforth Publishing, England © 2009, EPUB 
 Clowes (1898), The Royal Navy, A History from the Earliest Times to the Present (Vol. II). London. England: Sampson Low, Marston & Company, © 1898
 Endsor, Richard (2017) Title 'The Warship Anne' History of the new naval fleet of 30 ships begun in 1677 by King Charles II, and the Warship Anne a third rate 70 gun ship.
 Historical European Naval situation, Ship Design, construction, Armamant, Battle History, Wreck, Remains Today. Publisher: CONWAY - Bloomsbury Publishing Plc, ISBN: PB: 978-1-8448-6439-3

External links 
 "Anne" National Heritage List for England
 

Ships of the line of the Royal Navy
1670s ships
Protected Wrecks of England
1678 in England
Ships built in England
1690 in England
17th-century maritime incidents